Judy Horacek (born 12 November 1961) is an Australian cartoonist, artist, writer and children's book creator. She is best known for her award winning children's picture book Where is the Green Sheep? with Mem Fox, and her weekly cartoons in The Age newspaper. Horacek's latest book is Now or Never (2020), her tenth cartoon collection. A new picture book with Mem Fox, Bonnie and Ben Rhyme Again came out in October 2018.

In 2005, a selection of her work was acquired by the National Library of Australia for its collection. She said at the time that "I really like being recognised for having done work that is part of the social discourse. And it's always nice to see cartoons get another lease on life – now they represent a particular time and context and become part of the portrait of who we [Australians] are".

Life

Horacek graduated with a BA from the University of Melbourne in 1991, majoring in Fine Arts and English. She then studied for a Diploma in Museum Studies at Victoria University.  In 2007, she graduated with a Bachelor of Arts (Visual) in Printmedia and Drawing from Australian National University.

She lives in Melbourne.

Writing

Horacek started her career as a writer, and was a member of a community writing group in North Melbourne. Words are an important part of her cartoons, and sometimes dominate the pictures.

After illustrating a children's picture book for Mem Fox, she began to write and illustrate her own children's books, something she had always wanted to do.

Cartoons

"My life has been a quest to find new and better place to stick cartoons", Horacek has said. Accordingly, her cartoons can be found in newspapers and magazines, online, on aprons and teatowels, on mugs, on fridge magnets and cards, and as limited edition prints. Her cartoons have been described as whimsical and quirky. As she says, "I take every day situations and make them strange"

It was her interest in feminism which "drove Horacek's early work and established her reputation as a cartoonist". Since then, in addition to an ongoing interest in women's issues, her cartoons have covered a wide range of social and political issues such as the Australian Republican Movement, immigration, indigenous issues and FlyBuys. Cartoonist Peter Nicholson describes her work as follows:

Horacek's first commissioned work for The Age newspaper was published on International Women's Day 1995, next to the obituary of Senator Olive Zakharov. This was her cartoon, Woman with Altitude, a work which has since appeared on fridge magnets greeting cards, tea-towels and T-shirts. In 2007, she said that "The woman with altitude ... represents who we could be". At various times she has had regular spots in such newspapers and magazines as The Age, The Weekend Australian Magazine, The Canberra Times and the Australian Book Review.

Illustration
She illustrated Mem Fox's non-fiction book, Reading Magic, and in 2004 she illustrated her first children's book, Mem Fox's Where Is the Green Sheep?. It was shortlisted for several book awards, and in 2005 won the Children's Book Council of Australia Book of the Year – Early Childhood Award. She has since started writing her own children's books, the first being The Story of GROWL (2007), followed by "These are My Hands" (2008), "These are My Feet" (2009) and "Yellow is my favourite colour"

Children's Books
 Where Is the Green Sheep?, with Mem Fox (2004,  and )
 The Story of GROWL (2007)
 These are My Feet (2007)
 These are My Hands (2008)
 Yellow is my favourite colour (2010)
 Good Night, Sleep Tight, Mem Fox, Illustrated by Judy Horacek (2012)
 Yellow is my colour star (2014)
 This & That with Mem Fox (2015)
 Ducks Away! with Mem Fox (2016)
 Bonnie and Ben Rhyme Again with Mem Fox (2018)

Cartoon Books

 Life on the Edge, Introduced by Dale Spender (1992,  and 2003)
 Unrequited Love: Nos. 1–100 (1994)
 Lost in Space (1997)
 Woman with Altitude (1997,  and 1998)
 If the fruit fits (1999)
 I am woman, hear me draw / cartoons from the pen of Judy Horacek (2003)
 Make Cakes Not War, (2007)
 If you can't stand the heat (2010)
 The Night Before Mother's Day, Doug MacLeod, Illustrated by Judy Horacek (2012)
 Random Life (2017)
 Now or Never (2020)

Other Works

 Mary Jane: living through anorexia and bulimia nervosa / Sancia Robinson with Foong Ling Kong and cartoons by Judy Horacek (1996)
 The women's power pocket book / Joan Kirner and Moira Rayner with illustrations by Judy Horacek (2000)
 Reading Magic: how your child can learn to read before school and other important things / Mem Fox with illustrations by Judy Horacek (2001, ; 2004,  and 2005)

References

Citations
 Favelle, Kathryn (2005) "A new lease on life" in National Library of Australia News, XV (12), September 2005, pp. 7–10
Horacek, Judith (2007). Interviewed by Philip Williams, on Stateline Canberra, 2007-04-20 Accessed: 2007-09-20
  Horacek, Judith, artist and cartoonist (1998). Interviewed by Ann Turner
 Judith Maria Horacek (1961–) (2003) Accessed: 2007-09-20

External links
 
 Judy Horacek collection of cartoons – held and digitised by the National Library of Australia
 Portrait of Judy Horacek, cartoonist, by Virginia Wallace-Crabbe
 

1961 births
Living people
Australian people of Czech descent
Australian comics writers
Australian women cartoonists
Australian editorial cartoonists
Australian illustrators
Australian women illustrators
Australian children's book illustrators
Australian children's writers
University of Melbourne alumni
Australian women children's writers
Female comics writers